Chris Baker (born 2 February 1991) is an English athlete specialising in the high jump. He won a bronze medal at the 2016 European Championships. In addition, he represented Great Britain at the 2016 Summer Olympics without advancing to the final.

His personal bests in the event are 2.29 metres outdoors (Amsterdam 2016) and 2.36 metres indoors (Hustopece 2016).

Competition record

References

1991 births
Living people
Sportspeople from Norwich
English male high jumpers
British male high jumpers
Olympic male high jumpers
Olympic athletes of Great Britain
Athletes (track and field) at the 2016 Summer Olympics
Commonwealth Games competitors for England
Athletes (track and field) at the 2014 Commonwealth Games
Athletes (track and field) at the 2018 Commonwealth Games
European Athletics Championships medalists
British Athletics Championships winners